Claude M'Barali, professionally known as MC Solaar (born 5 March 1969), is a French rapper of Senegalese and Chadian origin. He is one of France's most famous and influential hip hop artists. Some consider him the best French rapper of all time.

MC Solaar is known for his complex lyrics and distinctive flows, which rely on word play, lyricism, and inquiry. In the English-speaking world, Solaar was signed by London-based acid jazz record label Talkin' Loud and recorded with British group Urban Species and rapper Guru, who was a member of New York-based rap group Gang Starr. Solaar has released eight studio albums and one live album. His eighth studio album, Géopoétique, produced by Alain Etchart and mixed by sound engineer David Gnozzi, won best album of the year at the Victoires de la Musique awards in 2018.

Biography

Early life
Claude M'Barali was born in Dakar, Senegal, to parents from Chad. When he was six months old, his parents immigrated to France where they settled in the Parisian suburbs; initially in Saint-Denis, subsequently Maisons-Alfort and finally Villeneuve-Saint-Georges. When he was twelve, he went to live with an uncle in Cairo, Egypt for nine months where he discovered the Universal Zulu Nation and became fascinated with the rapping styles of Afrika Bambaataa. Upon his return to France, he passed the baccalauréat. The constant support from his mother was one of the reasons that he was able to pass the baccalauréat and still make music. He coined the stage name "MC Solaar" during his adolescence from his graffiti tags "SOAR" and "SOLAAR".

He studied languages at the Jussieu university campus and was a postgraduate in philosophy. He released his first single in 1990. MC Solaar went to Paris in the summer of 1991 with his friend Jimmy Jay in hopes of succeeding in the music industry. Success came quickly when his first single, "Bouge de là" ("Get Out of There"), based on a sample from Cymande's song "The Message" (1973) became a hit in the early 1990s. Many rappers who came out of Africa at the time spoke a lot about slavery and other topics in order to bring the history of their people into light. Nevertheless, the song went platinum in France and reached #5 on the national charts.

1991–1997: Early success and Prose Combat breakthrough
After the success of "Bouge de là", Solaar went on to support the American rap group De La Soul when they performed at the Olympia in Paris in September 1991. At the close of 1991, Solaar released Qui Sème le Vent Récolte le Tempo which went on to sell over 400,000 copies in France. With the success of his debut album in France, Solaar embarked upon extensive tours of Poland and Russia. In December 1992, he performed in twelve countries across West Africa, where his French rap style proved popular with African music fans.

MC Solaar released Prose Combat in 1994. It sold 100,000 copies in the first week of being released and became a bestseller in 20 other countries. In February 1995 he received an award for Best Male Singer of the Year at the 10th edition of the French "Victoires de la Musique" awards. Also in 1994, MC Solaar appeared on the Red Hot Organization's compilation album, Stolen Moments: Red Hot + Cool. The album, meant to raise awareness and funds in support of the AIDS epidemic in relation to the African American community, was heralded as Album of the Year by Time.

Solaar returned to the studio in 1997 with longtime friend and producer Jimmy Jay to record his third album, Paradisiaque. The album was another success, which led to an extensive European tour starting on 9 January 1998 at the Zénith in Paris. MC Solaar toured internationally, including Germany, Japan and the United States. He was included as a guest on American rapper Guru's "Jazzmatazz" project and one of Solaar's songs was included in the Tommy Boy rap compilation in the United States.

Early in Solaar's career, it was important for him to share the struggles and the different hardships for black people that had emigrated to France and tried to make a better life. Most of his music was dedicated to enlightening the population of a specific deeper message that connected to him in his life. "[...] he addresses the conditions under which Black people have emigrated to and settled in France. In the piece "Leve-toi et rap," he describes his Chadian parents' migration from Senegal to a Parisian suburb, the main stages of his teenage years and how he finally came to discover rap." In an interview, MC Solaar described the feeling of making a song and the thought process while just writing any part of lyrics that go into his music. "I write quickly, because of the music, he tells me. It's much easier if you have the music, the rhythm, but I am fast. First, I have taken in "everything". Do you never write before the music? Ah. I used to, he admits. But when I met the music, I changed."

1997–2004: Cinquième As and Mach 6
Solaar released Cinquième As in 2001, to critical acclaim and Mach 6 in 2003. In the album's third track, "Lève-Toi et Rap", Solaar describes his parents' move to France as well as his own roots growing up in Villeneuve-Saint-Georges and Cairo.
Critic Dan Gennoe attests to Solaar's "flow et vocabulaire" by noting "the flow of his words is staggering, as are the low-slung grooves that they roll to; deftly vaulting all language barriers."

In 1998, MC Solaar embarked on a tour beginning at the Zénith de Paris. The concert he presents is a show with DJs and dancers (as the hip-hop dancer Bintou Dembélé) which overpasses the musical frame. The cover of Cinquieme As depicts Solaar topless, and draws comparisons to captives about to be taken onto a slave ship. However, a look at the inside cover reveals Solaar to be in a wrestler's costume, along with the other men in the picture. As Veronique Helenon discusses in her article concerning the French hip hop scene, references to Africa and "blackness" are a very important part of Solaar's music. Solaar recognises and pays tribute to the African presence in France by using boxing and wrestling references. Senegalese boxer Battling Siki is referenced in the album's booklet. Although Siki won the light heavyweight boxing championship in 1922, he still faced racism from journalists. This image combined with songs concerning colonial oppression and the migration experience from Africa to France show Solaar's "blackness," something that is extremely important in the French hip-hop scene. For example, in his song "Les Colonies", Solaar discusses the similarities between the oppression of Africans by colonialists to the modern day exploitation of "third world" countries. "Cinquième As" includes lyrics in French, English, and Spanish, which represents his ideals that rap should be inclusive of all people.  In early 2004, his 2001 song "La Belle et Le Bad Boy" was featured on the final episode of the U.S. television series Sex and the City. The MTV series "The Hills" featured the song as well.

2005–present: Chapitre 7 and international acclaim
"Da Vinci Claude", the first single from Solaar's album Chapitre 7, was launched in March 2007. The album was released on 18 June 2007. MC Solaar is best known outside France for his work on Guru's Jazzmatazz project and as a featured artist on the Missy Elliott track "All N My Grill". His collaboration with her propelled him to higher popularity in the U.S market. The single "Le Bien, Le Mal" (The Good, The Bad) has been a hip hop/dance crossover hit and has received playtime on MTV, which characterizes his work this way: "His fluid phrasing makes up for his lack of English, and the production on his solo work (by DJ Jimmy Jay and Boom Bass of La Funk Mob) surpasses that of most of his hip-hop contemporaries."

MC Solaar is one of the few French rappers having success in the English-dominated American hip hop culture. American rapper will.i.am admitted he prefers MC Solaar to American rapper Tupac Shakur.

Personal life
MC Solaar studied humanities in highly selective preparatory classes (hypokhâgne). On 7 December 2003, MC Solaar married Chloé Bensemoun and on 7 May 2004, she gave birth to the couple's first child, a son named Roman. In 2007, she gave birth to a daughter named Bonnie. They divorced in 2012.

Philanthropy
MC Solaar has been a member of the Les Enfoirés charity ensemble since 1997.

Discography

Albums
Studio albums

Live albums

Compilation albums

Maxis and EPs
Solaar Power EP
Inch'Allah EP

Singles

*Did not appear in the official Belgian Ultratop 50 charts, but rather in the bubbling under Ultratip charts. 

Collective singles

Featured in

Filmography
1991: Pour Kim Song-Man - short film by Costa-Gavras
2005: Mort à l'écran as Jonathan - short film by Alexis Ferrebeuf
2011: Illegal Love voice over - documentary by Julie Gali

Live albums
Le Tour de la Question (2 CD) (1998)

References and footnotes

External links

1969 births
Living people
People from Dakar
French male singers
French rappers
Chadian musicians
Black French musicians
French people of Senegalese descent
French people of Chadian descent
Senegalese emigrants to France
People from Villeneuve-Saint-Georges
University of Paris alumni
French Roman Catholics